The Tornado outbreak of November 16–18, 2015 was a highly unusual nocturnal late-season tornado outbreak that significantly impacted the lower Great Plains on November 16 before producing additional weaker tornadoes across parts of the Southern United States the following two days. The first day of the outbreak spawned multiple strong, long-track tornadoes, including two consecutive EF3s that caused major damage near Pampa, Texas. Overall, the outbreak produced 61 tornadoes in all, and was described as by the National Weather Service office in Dodge City, Kansas as being "unprecedented in recorded history for southwest Kansas" given the magnitude and the late season. In addition, the tornado outbreak brought the first November tornadoes into northwest Kansas, and the first strong tornadoes in the Texas Panhandle in November, as well as the further west any F3/EF3 tornadoes touched down this late in the calendar year. Despite spawning multiple strong tornadoes after dark, no fatalities and only one minor injury occurred as a result of the outbreak.

Meteorological synopsis 

An intense mid-level trough moved from the desert Southwest United States into the south-central High Plains, and low-level flow brought moisture from the Gulf of Mexico into the region, allowing dew points to reach the 50s and low 60s. Strong wind shear supported supercell thunderstorm development.

Confirmed tornadoes

November 16 event

November 17 event

November 18 event

Notes

References

External links

2015-11-16
United States,11
Tornadoes,11
Tornadoes in Texas
Tornadoes in Kansas
Tornadoes,11
Tornadoes,11
Tornadoes